Jana Nejedly (born June 9, 1974 as Jana Nejedlá) is a Czech-born Canadian former professional tennis player. Her highest WTA singles ranking is 64th, which she reached on October 2, 2000. Her career high in doubles was at 227 set on August 12, 1996.

Born in Prague and raised in Vancouver, Nejedly resided in Toronto, Boston, and Naples, Florida at different times. Nejedly retired in 2003 but had a brief return in 2012. She would finally retire for the last time that July.

ITF Circuit finals

Singles: 12 (8–4)

References

External links
 
 
 

1974 births
Living people
Canadian expatriate sportspeople in the United States
Canadian female tennis players
Canadian people of Czech descent
Czechoslovak emigrants to Canada
Naturalized citizens of Canada
Tennis players from Boston 
Sportspeople from Naples, Florida 
Tennis players from Prague
Sportspeople from Vancouver
Racket sportspeople from British Columbia
Tennis players from Toronto 
People with acquired Canadian citizenship